Ella May McFadyen (26 November 1887 – 22 August 1976) was an Australian poet, journalist and children's writer. For 18 years she conducted "The Children's Page" for The Sydney Mail and was known as Cinderella.

Early life and education

McFadyen was born at "Burrundulla", John Street, Stanmore on 26 November 1887 to Donald and Mary (née Wilson).

Career

McFadyen's first short story accepted for publication was "The Wedding of Dolly Valerie" in 1906. It appeared in the "Young Folks" column of The Sydney Mail and New South Wales Advertiser on 31 January 1906. Her first published poem was "A Satin Shoe", published in May 1906 in The Australasian.

In addition to contributing to The Sydney Mail, her poems and short stories appeared in a number of other newspapers, including Australian Town and Country Journal and The Lone Hand.

McFadyen's first book of poetry, Outland born and other verses, published in 1911, was favourably reviewed by The Register (Adelaide) of 2 December 1911, who wrote "has a wealth of imagery, a fertile fancy, much technical skill, and in particular a virility".

From May 1912 to July 1913 McFadyen was a regular contributor of short stories and poems to "A Page for the Children" in The Sydney Mail. In late 1919 she was chosen to conduct "The Children’s Page" for The Sydney Mail, a role she fulfilled until the newspaper closed on 28 December 1938. For a further two and a half years "Cinderella’s Column" appeared in The Sydney Morning Herald, the final article being on 26 June 1941.

McFadyen donated all profits from publication of her 1917 collection of war poems, Songs of the Last Crusade to War Funds and dedicated the book to her brother who was on active service.

In the early 1920s she wrote the words for a series of part songs composed by Florence E. Axtens for use in schools. Songs included "Till We Forget", "The Kangaroo", "Hush-a-Hush", "The Mosquito", "The Mountain Echo" and "Wattle Blossom".

In 1924–1925 The Sydney Mail published her novella, Matched Pearls, serialised in four instalments.

McFadyen was a foundation member of the Society of Women Writers, formed in Sydney in 1925.

Her poem "Tom-Tit" was selected by Joan S. Mackaness and George Mackaness for inclusion in Angus & Robertson's Frolic Fair: A Book of Australian Verse for Children Under Ten.

In 1938 Dymocks published a collection of McFadyen's poems, both published and unpublished, called Here's Fun for You!. S.E.N. of The Sydney Mail complemented her for her "singing pen" and considered them "felicitous verse" which was "well suited to the unsophisticated, assimilative, and wholesome minds of children".

Works

Books

Children
Pegmen Tales 1946, Angus and Robertson 
Pegmen Go Walkabout 1947, Angus and Robertson 
Little Dragons Of The Never Never 1948, Australasian Publishing Company 
The Wishing Star 1956, Angus and Robertson 
The Big Book of Pegmen Tales (contains stories from Pegmen Tales and Pegmen Go Walkabout) 1959, Angus and Robertson 
The little World Of The Pegmen (selections from Pegmen Tales) 1983, Angus and Robertson

Poetry collections

Theatre
Kookaburra Comedies: Junior Plays c.1950, Australia,  School Projects Limited

Music (lyrics)
Till We Forget, c.1921, Nicholson & Co 
The Kangaroo, c.1921, Nicholson & Co 
Hush-a-Hush: The She Oak's Lullaby, c.1921, Nicholson & Co 
The Mosquito, c.1921, Nicholson & Co 
The Mountain Echo, c.1921, Nicholson & Co 
Wattle Blossom, c.1921, Nicholson & Co

Personal papers

References

External links

 Obituary
List of McFadyen's stories that appeared in various Australian newspapers 1906-1922
 Race and Nation in Ella McFadyen's Pegmen Tales, Christopher Kelen, Journal of Literary Education (2019) no. 2 pp 178-198
 

1887 births
1976 deaths
20th-century Australian women writers
20th-century Australian poets
Australian women poets
Australian World War I poets
Writers from New South Wales